The 1988–89 Cypriot Fourth Division was the 4th season of the Cypriot fourth-level football league. The championship was split into four groups. The winners were:
 Group A: AEK Kythreas
 Group B: APEP Pelendriou
 Group C: Enosis Neon Ayia Napa
 Group D: Apollon Lympion

The four winners gave playoff matches and the two first were promoted to the 1989–90 Cypriot Third Division. Seven teams were relegated to regional leagues.

See also
 Cypriot Fourth Division
 1988–89 Cypriot First Division
 1988–89 Cypriot Cup

Cypriot Fourth Division seasons
Cyprus
1988–89 in Cypriot football